Bob Long (born 1942) is an American football wide receiver.

Bob Long may also refer to:

Bob Long (linebacker) (born 1934), American football linebacker
Bob Long (halfback) (born 1922), American football halfback
Bobby Long (child actor) (born 1935), star of It Happened in Brooklyn
Bob Long (baseball) (born 1954), former Major League Baseball pitcher
Bob Long, paintball player and owner of Bob Long Adrenaline Sports Technology, manufacturers of Bob Long Intimidator
Bobby Long (musician) (born 1985), British singer-songwriter
Bob Long (politician) (born 1957), councillor, Township of Langley first elected in 1999

See also
Bobby Joe Long (1953–2019), American serial killer and rapist
Robert Long (disambiguation)
A Love Song for Bobby Long, a 2004 film